The 2017–18 Serie A2 season, known for sponsorship reasons as the Serie A2 Old Wild West, is the 44th season of the Italian basketball second league Serie A2 Basket. The season started on September 29, 2017, and will end in June 2018 with the last game of the promotion playoffs finals.

Rules

The season is composed of 32 teams with a regional subdivision in two equal groups of sixteen, East and West. Each team plays twice each team in its subgroup, the first ranked team of each group then plays the eighth ranked team of the other group (e.g. East No. 1 against West No. 8), then the second best against the seventh, and so on, to form a promotion playoffs (for one place) of sixteen teams.

Teams

By region

Venues

East

West

Regular season

East Group league table

West Group league table

Coppa Italia
At the half of the league, the four first teams of each group in the table played the LNP Cup.

Bracket

Source:

Playout
The league play-out are played between the 14th and 15th placed teams of each group in two elimination rounds. The series will be played in a best-of-three format: the first, the second and the eventual fifth game will be played at home of the team that got the better ranking at the end of the regular season, the third and the eventual fourth will be played at home the lower ranked team.

Playoffs
The league's playoffs are played between the first and the eighth of each group in four rounds: eightfinals, quarterfinals, semifinals and final. All series are played in a best-of-five format: the first, the second and the eventual fifth match will be played at home of the best-placed team, the second, the third and the fourth, at the end of the regular season.

References

External links
Official website 

Serie A2 Basket seasons
2017–18 in Italian basketball
Italy